The Platino Award for Best Original  Score (Spanish: Premio Platino al mejor banda sonora) is one of the Platino Awards, Ibero-America's film awards, presented by the Entidad de Gestión de Derechos de los Productores Audiovisuales (EGEDA) and the Federación Iberoamericana de Productores Cinematográficos y Audiovisuales (FIPCA).

Spanish composer Alberto Iglesias holds the record of most wins in the category with five, four of them being consecutive (from 2017 to 2020). Iglesias also holds the record of most nominations with six.

In the list below. the winner of the award for each year is shown first, followed by the other nominees.

Awards and nominations

2010s

2020s

See also
 Goya Award for Best Original Score

References

External links
Official site

Platino Awards
Film awards for best score